Flower of Evil is a Philippine drama television series based on the 2020 South Korean drama series of the same title, starring Piolo Pascual and Lovi Poe. The series was aired on Kapamilya Channel's Yes Weekend Primetime block, Jeepney TV and A2Z from June 25 to October 9, 2022 replacing the fourth season of I Can See Your Voice and was replaced by Hoy Love You 3.

Synopsis
Jacob (Piolo Pascual) is a man who hides his identity and past from his wife Iris (Lovi Poe), a female detective. On the surface, they appear to be the perfect family: a loving couple with a beautiful six-year-old daughter who adores her parents.

Iris and her colleagues begin investigating a series of unexplained murders and is confronted with the reality that her seemingly perfect husband may be hiding something from her.

Cast and characters

Main cast
 Piolo Pascual as Jacob/ Daniel Villareal
 Lovi Poe as Iris Castillo del Rosario/Villareal

Supporting cast
 Paulo Avelino as Jacob del Rosario

 Edu Manzano as Henry del Rosario
 Agot Isidro as Carmen del Rosario

 Rita Avila as Gloria Castillo

 Joross Gamboa as Rico Gallardo
 Joem Bascon as Dennis Espinosa
 JC de Vera as Andrew Marcelo
 Jett Pangan as Gerry Payumo
Denise Laurel as Grace Villareal
 Pinky Amador as Maggie Alcantara
 Joko Diaz as Baldo Ongkiko
 Epy Quizon as Noel Ramirez
 Archie Adamos as Ruel Castro
 Gardo Versoza as Abel Villareal 
 Denise Laurel as Grace Villareal
 Carla Guevara as Lilia Ramirez
 Hazel Orencio as Evelyn Claverio
Sienna Stevens as Luna del Rosario
 Paul Jake Paule as Detective Candelaria

Guest cast
 Jeffrey Hidalgo as Erwin Santos
 Nikki Valdez as Melanie Santos
 Loren Burgos as Teodora "Teddy" Manangquil
 Yñigo Delen as Carlo Santos
 Claire Ruiz as Susan Mirasol
 Sherry Lara as Belen Soliven
 Jess Mendoza as Lando Soliven
 Junjun Quintana as Vincent Rosales
 Denise Joaquin as Raquel Rosales
 Rolando Innocencio as Ernesto Dimaculangan
 Peewee O'Hara as Tansing Ramos
 Aleck Bovick as Josie Medina
 Sheree Bautista as Monet Dimayuga

Episodes

Production

Development
The project was first announced on September 16, 2021, when Lovi Poe officially transferred to ABS-CBN for the first time, with Piolo Pascual returning to the network. Both actors were cast in the lead roles after signing with the network. A story conference was held on November 21, 2021. On 4 February 2022, it was revealed that the series was in the midst of its principal photography. A total of 32 episodes are confirmed for the series, running for sixteen weeks.

Casting
On November 21, 2021, the rest of the cast were announced in the same day of story conference.

Kit Thompson was originally part of the cast, but was later fired after he was arrested for hitting his former girlfriend. Thompson was replaced by JC de Vera.

Marketing
A short teaser for the series was shown as part of the upcoming projects for Dreamscape Entertainment in 2022. The first teaser was released on May 16, 2022. The second teaser was released on May 20, 2022. Official poster was released on May 23, 2022. The trailer of the series was released on May 31, 2022.

Release
The series released first on Viu on June 23, 2022, 48 hours before its television premiere on Kapamilya Channel, A2Z and Jeepney TV from June 25 to October 9, 2022. It is also released exclusively on iWantTFC and TFC IPTV on July 16, 2022, with the first 6 episodes, 48 hours before its broadcast in the United States and Canada.

Re-run
Flower of Evil re-aired from November 7, 2022 to January 20, 2023 on Kapamilya Channel's Primetime Bida Weeknight block, Jeepney TV, A2Z Primetime and TV5's Todo Max Primetime Singko block replacing A Family Affair and was replaced by Dirty Linen.

Official Soundtrack

Notes

References

External links
 

ABS-CBN drama series
Philippine melodrama television series
Television series by Dreamscape Entertainment Television
Philippine television series based on South Korean television series
Television shows set in the Philippines
Filipino-language television shows
2022 Philippine television series debuts
2022 Philippine television series endings